Seymour Lake or Seymour Lake may refer to:

Lakes
In Canada:
In Ontario
Seymour Lake (Algoma District)
Seymour Lake in Northumberland County at 44° 23′ 06″ North  77° 48′ 35″ West
Seymour Lake in Thunder Bay District at 50° 24′ 26″ North  88° 23′ 40″ West
 In British Columbia
 Seymour Lake (Seymour River), north of Vancouver

In the United States:
Lake Seymour (Minnesota)
Seymour Lake (Vermont)

In Australia:
In New South Wales
Seymour Lake in Holgate